Bradley Dean Schmulian (born 3 August 1990) is a New Zealand cricketer who plays for Central Districts.

Early life
He was born in Cape Town, South Africa, and moved to New Zealand at the age of nine. Schmulian was awarded the Auckland Cricket Association Men's Player of the Year in 2011/12, 2012/13 and 2015/16. He made a move to Hawke’s Bay from Auckland in November 2016 when he was not getting the opportunity in the Auckland cricket provincial setup. Schmulian played club cricket in Australia for the Waratah's club in Darwin. He picked up the coveted Ralph Wiese Medal and Premier Grade Cricketer Of The Year award in Darwin in 2017 with an average of 89.13 runs for the season.

Domestic career
He made his first-class debut for Central Districts in the 2017–18 Plunket Shield season on 23 October 2017. In the match, he scored 203 runs in the first innings, the highest total on debut in first-class cricket in New Zealand. The previous highest total for a player on debut in a New Zealand first-class match was 175, made by George Watson in the 1880–81 season. He made his List A debut on 27 November 2019, for Central Districts in the 2019–20 Ford Trophy.

References

External links
 

1990 births
Living people
New Zealand cricketers
Place of birth missing (living people)
Central Districts cricketers
Cricketers from Cape Town
South African emigrants to New Zealand